Mount Vernon City School District or Mount Vernon City Schools may refer to:

Mount Vernon City School District (New York), a district in New York state
Mount Vernon City School District (Ohio), a district in Ohio
Mount Vernon City Schools (Illinois)

See also
Mount Vernon High School (disambiguation)